Óscar Roberto Gacitúa González (born 2 June 1953) is a Chilean painter.

Biography
Son of the Chilean pianist Oscar Gacitúa Weston, Gacitúa was born in Santiago de Chile once his father returned to that country after having studied in the United States. By the other hand, his brother Roberto is also a painter.

From 1971 to 1972 he studied at the Pontifical Catholic University of Valparaíso School of Art. Then, from 1973 to 1976, he studied architecture at the same university. Later he worked in the Casa Mrksa piano workshop.

Since 1980 he has regularly exhibited his pictorial work in galleries and museums in Chile and abroad. His work is in the permanent collections of the main national museums of different countries.

In 2001, and according his sister Rebecca, he tried unsuccessfully to convince his father not to commit suicide in December 2001.

Expositions

 1980: Galería Época, at Santiago, Chile
 1982: Museo de Arte Assis Chateaubriand, at  São Paulo.
 1982: Galería del Cerro, Santiago
 1983: Galería de La Plaza, Santiago
 1983: Cabaret Lord Jim, Hotel Galerías Nacionales, Santiago
 1983: Galería Época, Santiago
 1984: Galería La Granola, at Viña del Mar (Chile).
 1985: Galería Universitaria, at Concepción (Chile).
 1985: Gacitúa, Instituto Cultural de Las Condes, at Santiago
 1985: Sala Universidad de Concepción, at Concepción (Chile).
 1985: Instituto Cultural de Las Condes, at Santiago.
 1986: Galería La Fachada, at Santiago.
 1986: La Polar-Oid, Galería Plástica 3, at Santiago.
 1989: Instituto Chileno-Norteamericano, at Concepción, Chile.
 1990: Galería de Arte Actual, at Santiago.
 1995: Un Volcán de Pasiones, Sala Telefónica del Sur, Puerto Montt and Sala Viña del Mar, at Vina del Mar.
 2007: Agua Destilada, Galería Cecilia Palma, en Santiago.

Collective exhibitions

 1977: III Bienal Internacional de Arte de Valparaíso, Museo Municipal de Bellas Artes, Valparaíso (Chile).
 1979: Primer Encuentro de Arte Joven, Instituto Cultural de Las Condes, Santiago.
 1979: Tercer Concurso Colocadora Nacional de Valores, Museo Nacional de Bellas Artes, Santiago.
 1980: II Encuentro de Arte Joven, Instituto Cultural de Las Condes, Santiago.
 1981: II Bienal de Arte Universitario, Universidad Católica, Museo Nacional de Bellas Artes, Santiago.
 1981: Tercer Encuentro de Arte Joven, Instituto Cultural de Las Condes, Santiago.
 1982: Certamen Nacional de Artes Plásticas, Museo de Arte Contemporáneo, Universidad de Chile, Santiago.
 1982: Exposición de G. Arestizábal y O. Gacitúa, Universidad Técnica Federico Santa María, Valparaíso.
 1982: Dibujos y pinturas de Germán Arestizábal, Oscar Gacitúa, Sala de Exposiciones Amigos del Arte, Santiago.
 1983: Chile - Chile, Cayman Gallery, New York.
 1983: Chistes de Nicanor Parra, Galería Época, Santiago.
 1983: Nos duele, Tideh.
 1983: Seis Dedos para una Mano, Galería de la Plaza, Santiago.
 1983: Ahora Chile, Galería Bucci, Santiago.
 1983: Artes Industrias de la Supervivencia, Galería Época, Santiago.
 1983: Primera Bienal de Grabado en Uruguay, Museo de Arte Contemporáneo, Montevideo (Uruguay).
 1983: 50 Años de Plástica en Chile, Instituto Cultural de Las Condes, Santiago.
 1984: Autorretrato, Galería Sur, Santiago.
 1984: Gacitúa, González, Galería Plástica 3, Santiago.
 1984: Sueños de Gloria, Galería Plástica 3, Santiago.
 1985: FestivaL Bellavista, Santiago.
 1985: Gráfica Xerox, Instituto Cultural de Las Condes, Santiago.
 1985: Galería Universitaria, en Talca (Chile).
 1985: Seis Artistas Chilenos, Galería 3 Piso, La Paz (Bolivia).
 1986: Casa Matucana, El 19, Santiago.
 1990: Museo de Arte Moderno, Castro, Chiloé (Chile).
 1991: Cuerpos Pintados, Museo Nacional de Bellas Artes, Santiago.
 1992: Exposición Colectiva, Sala de la Parroquia de Frutillar, X Region of Chile.
 1992: Cama, Galería Plástica Nueva San Francisco, Santiago.
 1993: Marina Dalla - Venezia y Oscar Gacitúa, Galería Plástica Nueva San Francisco, Santiago.
 1994: Chile Artes Visuales Hoy, Colección Museo Chileno de Arte Moderno, Salas Nacionales de Cultura Embajada de Chile, Buenos Aires (Argentina).
 1995: Primer Salón Nacional del Arte de la Acuarela Ricardo Anwanter V.S.S., Centro Cultural Austral, Valdivia (Chile).
 1996: VI Concurso Nacional de Pintura El Color del Sur, Municipalidad de Puerto Varas (Chile).
 1996: Muestra Colectiva del Museo Chileno de Arte Moderno, ILLA (Instituto Ítalo-latinoamericano), Rome, Italy.
 1997: Dibujos de Germán Arestizábal y Oscar Gacitúa, Galería ArteEspacio, Santiago.
 1997: Pintura, Grabado y Escultura, Galería de Arte Bosque Nativo (at Puerto Montt), Centro Cultural El Austral (en Valdivia) and in the Centro de Convenciones de Puerto Varas (Chile).

Collections

References

External link
 «Mirómetro» at Aninat Gallery

1953 births

Living people
Chilean people
Chilean painters
University of Chile alumni
Pontifical Catholic University of Valparaíso alumni
University of Bío-Bío alumni